The Hansjakob Way II, also called the Great Hansjakob Way (Großer Hansjakobweg) is a five-day circular walk through the Central Black Forest in Germany, from Haslach im Kinzigtal returning to Haslach. The roughly 92-kilometre-long hiking trail is named after the Baden author and parish priest, Heinrich Hansjakob (1837–1916). The route was opened in 1983 and is sponsored and managed by the Black Forest Club.

The waymark is a white diamond with a black Hansjakob hat, the headwear in which Hansjakob is portrayed in many contemporary pictures and photographs. At all the sights along the way, information boards have been erected, that relate mainly to the life and stores of Hansjakob.

Day tours/stages

First Stage: Haslach – Wolfach 
Haslach – Sandhaas Hut – Hausach – Gutach/Tower – Wolfach (16.5 km)

Second Stage: Wolfach – Brandenkopf 
Wolfach – Hohenlochen – Burzbühl – Bettelfrau – Brandenkopf (11 km)

Third Stage: Brandenkopf – Zell am Harmersbach 
Brandenkopf – Durben – Oberharmersbach – Mühlstein (Nordrach) – Zell am Harmersbach (21 km)

Fourth Stage: Zell am Harmersbach – Höhenhäuser 
Zell am Harmersbach – Niller Eck – Steinach – Heidenschlössle – Höhenhäuser (Gasthof Kreuz) (27 km)

Fifth Stage: Höhenhäuser – Haslach 
Höhenhäuser – Biereck – Hansjakob Chapel – Hofstetten – Haslach (17.5 km)

Literature 
 Martin Kuhnle: Schwarzwald Mitte/Nord. Bergverlag Rother, München 2013, S. 166–187.

External links 

 Black Forest hiking service: web facility of the Black Forest Club for visualising the Black Forest trails on Google Maps with various overlays (trail network, waymarks, accommodation, …)

Hiking trails in Baden-Württemberg
Ortenaukreis
Transport in the Black Forest